Saint James Station may refer to:

Railway stations in the UK 
Cheltenham Spa St. James railway station, Cheltenham, England
St James Park railway station in Exeter, England
Paisley St James railway station in Paisley, Renfrewshire, Scotland
St. James Street railway station, in Walthamstow, north-east London
Liverpool St James railway station, England, a disused station in Liverpool
St James's Park tube station, on the London Underground
St James Metro station, on the Tyne and Wear Metro in Newcastle upon Tyne, England

Other railway stations 
St. James (LIRR station), in St. James, New York
Saint James (VTA), a light-rail station in San Jose, California
St James railway station, Sydney, Australia
St James railway station in St James, Cape Town, South Africa

Other 
St James Station, New Zealand

See also
Saint James (disambiguation)